A Poem a Day is a 2018 medical South Korean television series starring Lee Yu-bi, Lee Joon-hyuk and Jang Dong-yoon. It aired on tvN's Mondays and Tuesdays at 21:30 KST time slot from March 26 to May 15, 2018.

Synopsis
The story of lives of people who work at the hospital like physical therapists, rehabilitation therapists, radiographers, nurses, medical trainees and more.

Cast

Main
 Lee Yu-bi as Woo Bo-young, a three-year physical therapist who wanted to become a poet.
 Lee Joon-hyuk as Ye Jae-wook, a physical therapy professor.
 Ahn Do-gyu as young Ye Jae-wook
 Jang Dong-yoon as Shin Min-ho, a physical therapy trainee.

Supporting

Department of Physical Therapy
 Lee Chae-young as Kim Yoon-joo
 Seo Hyun-chul as Yang Myung-cheol
 Shin Jae-ha as Kim Nam-woo
 Kim Jae-beom as Park Shi-won
 Jeon Hye-won as Choi Yoon-hee
 Park Han-sol as Lee Shi-eun

Department of Radiology
 Park Sun-ho as Han Joo-yong 
 Defconn as Kim Dae-bang

Special appearances
 Lee Kan-hee as Min-ho's mother
 Kim Il-woo as Min-ho's father
 Lee Hee-jin as Je-wook's ex-girlfriend (Ep. 5, 8-9)
 Lee Hae-in as Park Yeon-hee, Dae-bang's ex-girlfriend (Ep. 5)
 Mo Tae-bum as Mo Tae-bum, a sports star (Ep. 6)
 Go Se-won as Yoon-joo's ex-husband (Ep. 7)
 Ha Seok-jin as Ha Seok-jin, a patient (Ep. 11)
 Park Cho-rong as Kim Mi-rae, a college student (Ep. 12)
 Kim Won-hae as Kim Jung-soo, a doctor (Ep. 13)

Production
Gong Myung was first offered the role of Shin Min-ho but declined.

Viewership

Notes

References

External links
  
 
 

Korean-language television shows
TVN (South Korean TV channel) television dramas
2018 South Korean television series debuts
2018 South Korean television series endings
South Korean medical television series